A by-election for the seat of Canterbury in the New South Wales Legislative Assembly was held on 10 October 1914. The by-election was triggered by the bankruptcy of Henry Peters.

Dates

Candidates
George Cann was a member of the Australian House of Representatives for Nepean from the 1910 federal election until his defeat at the 1913 election. He was a candidate for the Legislative Assembly seat of Upper Hunter at the 1913 NSW election, but was defeated.
James Huston was an alderman in the Municipality of Bankstown.

Results

Henry Peters was made bankrupt.

See also
Electoral results for the district of Canterbury
List of New South Wales state by-elections

Notes

References

1914 elections in Australia
New South Wales state by-elections
1910s in New South Wales